High Bridge Park is a  public park located at Riverside Ave. and A St. in Latah/Hangman, Spokane, Washington. It is open daily, without charge.

Latah Creek runs along the eastern boundary of the park. The valley carved by the creek is crossed by three bridges carrying Interstate 90, Sunset Boulevard and a railroad. These bridges cross above the southern portion of the park. A gravel road for vehicular traffic passes through the park from A Street in the north to 13th Avenue in the south.

Near the center of the park is a maintained grass area with amenities typical of other parks in the city. Picnic tables and grills are scattered about on the grass. There is also a picnic area with a wooden roof. A small playground is provided for children. While not as forested as the rest of the park, tall Ponderosa Pine trees shade the grassy area. A second, smaller, grass area lies up a hill immediately to the west.

The remainder of the park is quite different. Located less than two miles west of the city center, the park was plotted for development in the early days of Spokane. In the first half of the 20th century, the park was home to a tourist auto-camping park. After World War II, the park became home to federal housing for veterans. The motor home was eventually abandoned and the land became part of the park. The buildings are gone but obvious traces of the former neighborhood remain. Streets and sidewalks, now closed to traffic, are slowly succumbing to nature. Lots where mobile homes once stood are now highly forested.

Weaving around the park, but avoiding the main grass area, is an 18 hole, par-3 disc golf course. In January 2011, a dog park was opened in the portion of the park west of A Street.

High Bridge Park is adjacent to, but separate from, two other city parks. On the steep, 500 foot high ridge across Latah Creek is Overlook Park. Directly North across Riverside Avenue is People's Park where Latah Creek joins the Spokane River. On the river is the clothing optional beach, which People’s Park has become known for since 1974.

High Bridge Park developed a reputation for public sex acts. Between 2001 and 2006, the Spokane police department received 27 calls about lewd conduct and 6 people were arrested in June 2006.

Gallery

See also 
Spokane, Washington - Parks and recreation
High Bridge (Latah Creek)

References

External links
Spokesman-Review article about the park.
Professional Disc Golf Association course guide.

Parks in Spokane County, Washington
Geography of Spokane, Washington
Tourist attractions in Spokane, Washington